Annie Virginia McCracken (McLaughlin; pen name, Alma Vivian Mylo; October 13, 1868 – 1892 or later) was a pseudonymous American author who wrote short stories for literary magazines. She also founded a magazine, serving as its editor and proprietor.

Biography
Annie Virginia McLaughlin was born in Charleston, South Carolina, October 13, 1868. Her father, a native of Ireland, came to the U.S. when a small boy, living his early life in New York City. Her mother was a native of Boston.

McCracken's education was begun in Charleston. Leaving the Normal School of that city, she graduated from the Visitation Academy of Frederick, Frederick, Maryland, ranking first in her class each of the four years that she studied at that institution.

Career
Going to New York with her brother, a practicing attorney there she married Mr. McCracken and was widowed in less than a year. Returning to her old home in South Carolina, she began writing for diversion, receiving encouragement for her work. 

In January, 1892, McCracken became contributing editor to the Lyceum Magazine of Asheville, North Carolina. In May of that year, she issued, as editor and proprietor, an illustrated monthly magazine, The Pine Forest Echo. In addition to its literary features, it was designed to describe the historical environs of the health resort, Summerville, South Carolina, where she lived.

McCracken wrote short stories, notably for the Old Homestead, of Savannah, Georgia, as well as for The Sunny South, Peterson's Magazine, the St. Louis Magazine, and the American Household.

Selected works

Short stories
 "A Little Rebel", 1891
 "Greek Princess", 1891

References

External links
 

1868 births
Wikipedia articles incorporating text from A Woman of the Century
Writers from Charleston, South Carolina
19th-century American women writers
19th-century pseudonymous writers
Pseudonymous women writers
19th-century American short story writers
American magazine founders
American magazine editors
Year of death unknown